A Bolha (The Bubble) is a Brazilian rock (music) band that formed in 1965 as The Bubbles.

History
The Band was started by Cesar and Renato Ladeira in 1965.  They started out only playing cover songs and in 1966 released their first single, The Bubbles, which consisted of 2 cover songs by The Rolling Stones and Los Shakers.  In 1970 they changed their name to A Bolha and the band now consisted of Renato Ladeira on keyboard, Pedro Lima on guitar, Arnaldo Brandão on bass and Gustavo Schroeter on drums.

In 1971 their next single, Sem Nada, was released, and in 1973 their first LP Um Passo à Frente was recorded and released.  In 1977 their next LP, É Proibido Fumar was released.  After 30 years of not recording they finally released a CD in 2007 called É so curtir.

They have played with famous Brazilian musicians such as Gal Costa, Erasmo Carlos, Caetano Veloso and Raul Seixas.

Discography
The Bubbles (1966)
Side A: Não Vou Cartar o Cabelo (Break It All)
Side B: Por que Sou Tão Feio (Get Out of My Cloud)
A Bolha (1971)
Side A: Sem Nada/18:30
Side B: Os Hemadecons Cantavam em Coro Chôôôô..
Um Passo a Frente (1973)
 01 – Um Passo à Frente
 02 – Razão de Existir
 03 – Bye My Friend
 04 – Epitáfio
 05 – Tempos Constantes
 06 – A Espera
 07 – Neste Rock Forever
 É proibido fumar (1977, LP)
 01 – Deixe Tudo de Lado
 02 – Difícil é Ser Fiel
 03 – É Proibido Fumar
 04 – Estações
 05 – Sai do Ar
 06 – Consideração
 07 – Torta de Maçã
 08 – Luzes da Cidade
 09 – Clímax
 10 – Vem Quente Que Eu Estou Fervendo
 11 – Talão de Cheques
 É so curtir (2007, CD)
 01 – É Só Curtir
 02 – Não Sei
 03 – Cinema Olimpia
 04 – Sem Nada
 05 – Sub Entendido
 06 – Não Pare na Pista
 07 – Matermatéria
 08 – Cecília
 09 – Você Me Acende ( You Turn Me On) - Part. Esp.: Erasmo Carlos
 10 – Rosas
 11 – Desligaram os Meus Controles

Soundtracks
Salário Minimo, Brazilian film from 1970 in which the band appears playing in the opening.
1972, 2006 Brazilian movie in which the band plays the songs É Só Curtir and Sem Nada.

Bibliography
Bahiana, Ana Maria. Almanaque Anos 70. Rio de Janeiro: Ediouro, 2006 (Almanac of the 70s.)
https://web.archive.org/web/20070312180705/http://www.senhorf.com.br/revista/revista.jsp?codTexto=2461 (Portuguese)

Musical groups established in 1965
Brazilian progressive rock groups
1965 establishments in Brazil